Vitesse was founded in 1982 as a Portuguese company making diecast cars mostly in 1:43 scale. It was founded in the city of Oporto and is a brand name of Cinerius, Ltd.

The Fit of Vitesse
Because of detail and realism of the models, Vitesse gained increasing popularity in the late 1980s and 1990s. Models were often similar in concept to French Solido, though less toy-like and more oriented to collectors. Conceptually, then, Vitesse falls somewhere between Solido and the Italian Brumm in presentation. Though diecast, and realistic, models were rather fragile. Pieces tended to fall off, bodies separated from chassis and paint sometimes peeled - but in good condition they were impressive.

By about 1992, Vitesse had produced about 40 different models, often in top-up or top-down versions like Brumm or Rio Models. Offerings were made in plenty of liveries. For example, by 1990, the 1947 Chrysler Windsor model (a car also produced by Solido) had been produced in at least eight different versions: a plain sedan, New York City police, San Francisco Fire Brigade, Istanbul Taxi, official French government car, a French voisin 'pompiers', a Hot Springs National Park hotel taxi, and a clever Zippo lighters version with the middle of the car looking like two zippo lighters standing up together.

It seems the company didn't take itself too seriously. Vitesse referred to its rather fragile offerings as 'toys' in a rather self-deprecating manner. The cover of the 1990 full-color catalog showed a 1957 Buick as a planter, Citroen 2 CVs with live rabbits, a VW bug cabriolet nearly being 'driven' by a golf club, and a 1953 Caddy between two buns - our next meal in miniature.

Portuguese diecast
In 1990, the oldest Vitesse model was a 1934 White truck and the newest was a contemporary Peugeot 205, but most models were from the 1950s. Of course, Portugal had no vehicles of its own to offer to stoke nationalism, so models were fairly evenly selected from Britain, Germany, France, Italy and the United States. Inside the front cover of one catalog, an introduction to Vitesse was given in nine different languages. Like Solido in the 1980s and 1990s, several different American cars were reproduced, but like Brumm, European cars were often made in varying race decorations.  For example, the Lancia Delta HF Turbo Integrale was offered in at least 19 different racing  variations.

The 1982 company beginning doesn't appear to be chance. With Portugal joining the European Union in 1984, it seems natural that more diversity of investment would occur and that different niche companies of all types would start appearing there, shoring up Portugal's less developed economy. Vitesse seems to have been one of these companies that benefited. Quartzo was a racing car line owned by Vitesse. Onyx Models and Trofeu were two other independent Portuguese brands started at about the same time, also possibly as start-up companies with EU influenced funding.

Other toy companies such as Metosul with recasting's of Dinkys and smaller sized Novacars had come out of Portugal earlier, but no company with the collector flair, variety of liveries, and sophistication of detail like Vitesse had previously appeared there. For comparison, fewer such companies seem to have come out of Greece, a country similar in environment, economic status and which had joined the EU even earlier than Portugal.  Yet Greece's toy brands (like Polfi Toys) remained just that - toys more crudely cast and more for children.

Vitesse also produces models for other companies, but most are produced under the Vitesse name.

Variety and detail
Despite the company's overt sense of humor, its products were ultra-detailed and precise in proportion and presentation. Rixon reports on Vitesse's 1960 Aston Martin DB4 commenting on the model's "simulated wooden steering wheel", "banks of dashboard clocks", and "metal mesh radiator" and "astonishing photo etched wire spoke wheels". Other European cars like the 1938 BMW 328 roadster were typical. The 2-tone Austin Healey 3000 was very well-designed...even if the paint peeled off of the sides.

When the Sachsenring "Trabi" (Trabant) became the symbol of the fall of the Berlin Wall in 1989, Vitesse quickly jumped at the chance to produce it in miniature and sell it across a unified Germany and an emotional Europe. A unique American issue was the 'Carrera Panamericana' version of its 1953 Cadillac Type 62, whose two-tone color treatment included detailed race decals. With Vitesse there was rarely the feeling of 'just another Lamborghini Diablo', though it did offer its own Porsche 911 and Ferrari 308 GTB both of which have been offered by about every other diecast company on the planet.

One rather fragile offering was the 1956 Ford Fairlane police car. The model came with two delicate spotlights, two roof lights (one blue, one red) a very long antenna, and a "speed kills" speedometer sign affixed to the roof. Only 5,000 of these cars were made, so chances of finding one with all lights and parts intact may be a challenge.

Promotions
Vitesse also was quick to offer models in promotional guises, particularly related to racing sponsors. A specially packaged Coca-Cola Porsche 917, a Martini Lancia, special Peugeot promotional models and others made for Rothmans or Kenwood.

One popular promotional model often seen in the U.S. was the 3.5-inch 1/64 scale UPS truck. Sometimes seen mounted on special bases, the truck is impressively detailed with official UPS brown colors and logo.

Vitesse today
Eventually Vitesse was purchased by Sun Star Models of Macau, a maker of 1:18 scale diecasts. Three former Vitesse lines are now supported by Sun Star: Vitesse Models, Vitesse Rallye, and Quartzo which does race car replicas.

References
 

Model manufacturers of Portugal
Portuguese brands
Toy brands
1:43 scale models
Toy cars and trucks
Die-cast toys
Model cars